Koufovouno is a settlement in the municipality of Didymoteicho in the northern Evros regional unit, Greece. It is situated on a low hill near the right bank of the river Erythropotamos, at 70 m elevation. In 2011 its population was 629. It is 3 km southwest of Ellinochori, 5 km southeast of Kyani, and 5 km west of Didymoteicho.

History
During the Ottoman period, Koufovouno was inhabited mostly by Bulgarians and Turks. It was occupied by the Greeks at the end of World War I and it became a part of Greece. Its current population is mostly descendants of Greek refugees from Eastern Thrace.

Population

See also

List of settlements in the Evros regional unit

References

External links
Koufovouno at the GTP Travel Pages

Didymoteicho
Populated places in Evros (regional unit)